The 2012 Eastern Kentucky Drillers season was the 2nd season for the United Indoor Football League franchise. The Drillers were able to finish the season with a 6-4 record, but suspended themselves from the playoffs for violating league rules.

Schedule
Key:

Regular season
All start times are local to home team

Standings

y - clinched conference title
x - clinched playoff spot

Roster

References

Kentucky Drillers
Eastern Kentucky Drillers
Eastern Kentucky Drillers